Yasid is a Palestinian town in the Nablus Governorate in northern West Bank, located 15 kilometers northeast of Nablus. According to the Palestinian Central Bureau of Statistics (PCBS), the town had a population of 2,291 inhabitants in mid-year 2006.

Location
Yasid is located 8.6 km north of Nablus. It is bordered by Wadi al Far’a to the east, the village of Siris to the north, Beit Imrin and Jaba’ to the west, and Talluza and ‘Asira ash Shamaliya villages to the south.

History
Sherds from Iron Age (I-II) Persian early and late Roman, Byzantine, Early Islamic and Medieval periods have been found here.

Yasid was identified with Yaṣat or Yaset, mentioned in the 9th-8th century BCE Samaria Ostraca (No. 9,-10, 19 and 47) and later in the 6th-7th century Mosaic of Reḥob as a Jewish village in the region of Sebastia which was inhabited mostly by non-Jews and, therefore, agricultural produce obtained from the area could be taken by Jews without the normal restrictions imposed during the Sabbatical years, or the need for tithing.

Ottoman era
Yasid, like the rest of Palestine, was incorporated into the Ottoman Empire in 1517, and in the census of 1596 it was a part of the nahiya ("subdistrict") of Jabal Sami which was under the administration of the liwa ("district") of Nablus. The village had a population of 47 households and 2 bachelors, all Muslim. The villagers paid taxes on wheat, barley, summer crops, olive trees, beehives and/or goats, in addition to occasional revenues and a tax on Muslims in the Nablus area; a total of 7,340 akçe.

In 1838, Yasid was located in the Haritheh District, north of Nablus.

In 1882, in the PEF's Survey of Western Palestine (SWP), Yasid was described as "A village of moderate size on a knoll, with a few trees."

British Mandate era
In the 1922 census of Palestine conducted by the British Mandate authorities, Yasid had a population of 308 Muslims, increasing in the 1931 census to 372; 369 Muslims and 3 Christians, in 67 houses.

In the 1945 statistics, Yasid had a population of 480 Muslims while the total land area was 9,222 dunams, according to an official land and population survey. 
Of this, 860 dunams were used for plantations and irrigable land, 4,040 for cereals, while 43 dunams were classified as built-up areas.

Jordanian era
In the wake of the 1948 Arab–Israeli War, and after the 1949 Armistice Agreements, Yasid came  under Jordanian rule.

In 1961, the population was 714.

Post 1967
Since the Six-Day War in 1967, Yasid has been under Israeli occupation, and the same year the population was recorded as 816. 

After the 1995 accords, all of the land in Yasid is classified as Area A land.

References

Bibliography

 
 

   
 
 

 
Perlmann, Joel: The 1967 Census of the West Bank and Gaza Strip: A Digitized Version. Annandale-on-Hudson, N.Y.: Levy Economics Institute of Bard College. November 2011 – February 2012. [Digitized from: Israel Central Bureau of Statistics, Census of Population and Housing, 1967 Conducted in the Areas Administered by the IDF, Vols. 1–5 (1967–70), and Census of Population and Housing: East Jerusalem, Parts 1 and 2 (1968–70).]

External links
  Welcome To Yasid
Survey of Western Palestine, Map 11:  IAA, Wikimedia commons
Yasid Village Profile, Applied Research Institute–Jerusalem (ARIJ)
 Yasid, aerial photo, ARIJ
Development Priorities and Needs in Yasid, ARIJ

Nablus Governorate
Villages in the West Bank
Municipalities of the State of Palestine
Ancient Jewish settlements of Samaria